= Hourstone =

- Genres: Indie; Alternative; rock; pop
- Occupations: singer; songwriter
- Instruments: piano, vocals
- Years active: 2019 - present
- Website: hourstonemusic.com

Hourstone is a singer and songwriter, currently based in Singapore.

== Career ==
Hourstone learned classical piano between the ages of seven and fourteen and then began writing original music from the age of fifteen onwards, first to deal with life difficulties following the sudden deaths of his uncle and father and after relocating to a foreign country. According to Hear65 magazine, his music stands for strength in darkness and a phenomenon that moves something deep within our cores.

Following the releases of Halfway House and Counting Down to 2 in 2019, Hourstone released his third music video, I Will Find A Way, which is about something we can all relate to, overcoming life challenges, in February 2020.

In September 2023, his single release Hypnotherapology and its music video received 24 awards and 19 semi-finalist awards from notable institutions including the Los Angeles IndieX Film Fest and the Milan Filmmaker Awards. In November 2023, Hourstone released the single Carry You (Like I Do), which deals with overcoming grief and loss.

In January 2024, Hourstone released his single, My Sorceress. The love song focuses on the eternal dialogue between men and women.

== Discography ==
- 2019: Halfway House
- 2020: Counting Down to 2
- 2020: I Will Find a Way
- 2020: Not a River
- 2020: If We Lived Forever, We Would Never Have Been Born (piano)
- 2020: The Warm Rain of Home (piano)
- 2020: 7 Years to Where You Belong (piano)
- 2020: Eye of the Storm (piano)
- 2021: Counting Down to 2 (piano)
- 2022: Running up That Hill
- 2022: All You're Dreaming Of
- 2022: Feel You Always (piano)
- 2023: Skyscraper
- 2023: Hypnotherapology
- 2023: Carry You (Like I Do)
- 2023: Chandelier
- 2023: Halfway House (piano)
- 2023: I Will Find a Way (piano)
- 2024: My Sorceress
- 2024: My Sorceress (piano)
- 2024: Milky Way
